The ceremonial county of Nottinghamshire, 
(which includes the unitary authority of 
Nottingham),
is divided into 11 parliamentary constituencies
- three borough constituencies and eight county constituencies.

Constituencies

2010 boundary changes
In the Fifth Review the Boundary Commission for England recommended that Nottinghamshire retained its current constituencies, with changes only to reflect revisions to local authority ward boundaries and to reduce the electoral disparity between constituencies..

Proposed boundary changes 
See 2023 Periodic Review of Westminster constituencies for further details.

Following the abandonment of the Sixth Periodic Review (the 2018 review), the Boundary Commission for England formally launched the 2023 Review on 5 January 2021 and published their initial proposals on 8 June 2021. Initial proposals were published on 8 June 2021 and, following two periods of public consultation, revised proposals were published on 8 November 2022. Final proposals will be published by 1 July 2023.

The commission has proposed retaining the current number of constituencies in Nottinghamshire, as detailed below, with minor boundary changes to reflect changes to electoral wards within the county and to bring the electorates within the statutory range. As Nottingham North now contains wards in the Borough of Broxtowe, it would become Nottingham North and Kimberley. It is proposed that Sherwood is renamed Sherwood Forest.

Containing electoral wards from Ashfield

 Ashfield (part)
 Sherwood Forest (part)

Containing electoral wards in Bassetlaw

 Newark (part)
 Bassetlaw

Containing electoral wards in Broxtowe

 Broxtowe
 Nottingham North and Kimberley (part)

Containing electoral wards in Gedling

 Gedling
 Sherwood Forest (part)

Containing electoral wards in Mansfield

 Ashfield (part)
 Mansfield

Containing electoral wards in Newark and Sherwood

 Newark (part)
 Sherwood Forest (part)

Containing electoral wards in Nottingham

 Nottingham East
 Nottingham North and Kimberley (part)
 Nottingham South

Containing electoral wards in Rushcliffe

 Newark (part)
 Rushcliffe

Results history
Primary data source: House of Commons research briefing - General election results from 1918 to 2019

2019 
The number of votes cast for each political party who fielded candidates in constituencies comprising Nottinghamshire in the 2019 general election were as follows:

Percentage votes 

11974 & 1979 - Liberal Party; 1983 & 1987 - SDP-Liberal Alliance

* Included in Other

Seats

Maps

Historical representation by party
A cell marked → (with a different colour background to the preceding cell) indicates that the previous MP continued to sit under a new party name.

1885 to 1918

1918 to 1950

1950 to 1983

1983 to present

See also
 List of parliamentary constituencies in the East Midlands (region)

Notes

References

Nottinghamshire
Parliamentary constituencies in Nottinghamshire
Constituencies